Jyeshta is a 2004 Indian Kannada-language drama film starring Vishnuvardhan, Ashima Bhalla and Devaraj. The film is a remake of Malayalam film Valliettan (2000), is directed and written by director Suresh Krissna and features soundtrack from S. A. Rajkumar. The original version was directed by Shaji Kailas and featured Mammootty and Shobhana.

Released on 17 December 2004, the film met with average and critical response at the box-office.

Cast 
 Vishnuvardhan as Vishnu "Jyeshta"
 Ashima Bhalla as Kanchana, Vishnu’s wife
 Devaraj  as Devu, Vishnu’s younger brother
 Aniruddh as Ani, Vishnu’s adopted brother
 Sourav as Sourav, Vishnu’s younger brother 
 Master Anand as Anand, Vishnu’s youngest brother 
 Sindhu Menon as Gowri
 Ramesh Bhat as Ramanna
 Nawab shah
 Tara
 Avinash
 Rangayana Raghu
 Sharath Lohitashwa as Bhadra
 Shobharaj as Gowri’s brother 
 Master Karthik
 Sudeep as narrator

Soundtrack 
All the songs are composed and scored by S. A. Rajkumar

References 

2004 films
2000s Kannada-language films
Indian drama films
Kannada remakes of Malayalam films
Films directed by Suresh Krissna
Films scored by S. A. Rajkumar